The Furthest Station  is a novella in the Peter Grant series by English author Ben Aaronovitch. The novella is set after the fifth (Foxglove Summer) but before the sixth (The Hanging Tree) novel in the series.

Teaming up with BTP Sergeant Jaget Kumar, his parents' young neighbour Abigail Kamara, Inspector Nightingale and Toby the ghost hunting dog, PC Peter Grant tackles the mystery of ghostly encounters on the Metropolitan Line. Weirder still, the witnesses forget about their experiences mere minutes after they've occurred. As the mystery unravels, Grant and company leave London for the leafy suburbs of Chesham, Buckinghamshire, the Furthest Station on the Metropolitan Line.

References

External links
 The Furthest Station, subterraneanpress
 Novella Review: The Furthest Station by Ben Aaronovitch

Rivers of London (book series)
Novels by Ben Aaronovitch
English fantasy novels